Sir William Arrol (13 February 1839 – 20 February 1913) was a Scottish civil engineer, bridge builder, and Liberal Unionist Party politician.

Career
The son of a spinner, Arrol was born in Houston, Renfrewshire, and started work in a cotton mill at only 9 years of age. He started training as a blacksmith by age 13, and went on to learn mechanics and hydraulics at night school. In 1863 he joined a company of bridge manufacturers in Glasgow, but by 1872 he had established his own business, the Dalmarnock Iron Works, in the east end of the city. The business evolved to become Sir William Arrol & Co., a large international civil engineering business.

Projects undertaken by the business under his leadership included the replacement for the Tay Bridge (completed in 1887), the Forth Bridge (completed in 1890) and Tower Bridge (completed in 1894). He was also contracted by the Harland and Wolff Shipyard, Belfast, to construct a large gantry (known as the Arrol Gantry) for the construction of three new super-liners, one of which was called the RMS Titanic.

Arrol was knighted in 1890, and elected as the Liberal Unionist Member of Parliament (MP) for South Ayrshire at the 1895 general election, serving the constituency until 1906. He served as President of The Institution of Engineers and Shipbuilders in Scotland from 1895–97. He spent the latter years of his life on his estate at Seafield House, near Ayr, where he died on 20 February 1913. He is buried in Woodside Cemetery, Paisley, on the north side of the main-east west path on the crest of the hill.

Legacy
In 2013 he was one of four inductees to the Scottish Engineering Hall of Fame. His image is also featured on the Clydesdale Bank £5 note introduced in 2015.

See also
 People on Scottish banknotes

References

Further reading
 Peter R. Lewis, Beautiful Railway Bridge of the Silvery Tay: Reinvestigating the Tay Bridge Disaster of 1879, Tempus, 2004, .
Charles McKean Battle for the North: The Tay and Forth bridges and the 19th century railway wars Granta, 2006, 
 John Rapley, Thomas Bouch : the builder of the Tay Bridge, Stroud : Tempus, 2006, 
 PR Lewis, Disaster on the Dee: Robert Stephenson's Nemesis of 1847, Tempus Publishing (2007) 
 Sir Robert Purvis, Sir William Arrol a Memoir, London, 1913

External links 
 Sir William Arrol: History and legacy of the pioneering Scottish Engineer.
 

1839 births
1913 deaths
People from Renfrewshire
Bridgeton–Calton–Dalmarnock
Knights Bachelor
Presidents of the Institution of Engineers and Shipbuilders in Scotland
Scottish civil engineers
Bridge engineers
Liberal Unionist Party MPs for Scottish constituencies
UK MPs 1895–1900
UK MPs 1900–1906
Scottish Engineering Hall of Fame inductees
19th-century Scottish businesspeople